Daniel Gregory Clark (born 3 July 1976) is an English actor, comedian, writer, director, and singer. He is best known for playing Don Danbury on the BBC Three sitcom How Not to Live Your Life, which he also wrote, co-produced, and sometimes directed. He has been a regular on the British comedy scene as both a sketch and stand-up comedian.

Career

Early career
Clark started his career in comedy at the age of 19 by taking a play he co-wrote and starred in with old school friend Oliver Maltman to the Edinburgh Fringe Festival. In the years that followed, Clark formed a comedy trio called Electric Eel and they performed at the Edinburgh Festival in 1998 and 1999. Also in 1999, they made a pilot for C4's Comedy Lab series, called Roy Dance is Dead, and the following year a full series was commissioned. In February 2002, retitled The Estate Agents, the series was broadcast. Electric Eel followed the series with a UK tour and another Edinburgh Festival run.

In 2003, Clark took his first one-man show to Edinburgh. 57 Minutes was a mix of monologues and sketches. The following year, he began a career in stand-up. He took a full hour show to the Edinburgh Festival in 2005, 2006, and 2007. He also began his monthly comedy night, Clark's, which he would host and curate. In the summer of 2006, Clark wrote and performed in a series of shorts for the Paramount Comedy Channel (now Comedy Central UK) called Dan Clark's Guide to Dating. That was followed by another series called Dan Clark's Guide to Working. The shorts were broadcast between main TV shows on the channel but were subsequently put online and gathered huge numbers of views on YouTube.

How Not To Live Your Life
After the success of the Dan Clark's Guide to... series, there was interest from the BBC to develop the format. The pilot was shot in the summer of 2007 called How Not To Live Your Life. It combined a traditional sitcom narrative with the quick fire "what not to do" lists from the Paramount shorts. A full series was commissioned and went out in August 2008. It started with modest viewing figures but grew over the course of three seasons, doubling its viewing figures each series. It became a cult hit with the third series getting viewing figures of 1.4 million across the week's repeats. Additionally, it was regularly the second most watched show on the BBC iPlayer. In 2011, BBC3 controller Danny Cohen left the channel to go to BBC1. New controller Zai Bennet cancelled many of the comedies on the channel, including How Not To Live Your Life]. He did, however, commission a Christmas special, allowing Clark and co to wrap up the series and give the fans a conclusion to the love story which had developed over the three seasons. Clark wrote every episode of the show (20 in total), co-produced all three seasons, and directed various episodes of the first series.

Other television work
Clark has various TV credits to his name. His first television appearance was in a December 1996 episode of Only Fools and Horses, where he played a mugger in the iconic "Batman and Robin" scene. In 1998, he appeared in season 10 of Hale and Pace. In 2003, he appeared in the British sitcom Mad About Alice as Jason.

In 2004, he appeared as Johnny Two Hats in The Mighty Boosh episode "Electro". The same year, he had guest appearances in French and Saunders and in the 2005 Christmas special of My Family. In 2006, Clark appeared in the ITV comedy drama series The Complete Guide to Parenting. In 2008, Clark played the character Astroburn in an episode of the ITV2 sitcom No Heroics, written and created by Clark's How Not To Live Your Life script editor Drew Pearce.

Clark performed alongside fellow comedian Noel Fielding in the E4 series Noel Fielding's Luxury Comedy in 2012. On 28 March 2013, Clark starred in the comedy 30 & Counting as part of Sky Living's Love Matters series. The show, about three recently single friends, also featured comedian Brett Goldstein and reunited Clark with one of his How Not To Live Your Life co-stars, Daniel Taylor.

Stand-up comedy
On 25 March 2011, Clark began his first full national tour with a stand-up show entitled Dan Clark Live! The show received generally good reviews. The Guardian said, "Clark is that of a rare combination − a great gagsmith and actor, and the result is a stand-up show that is both strong on jokes and drama."

In May 2012, Clark put together a band and performed the show These Songs May Contain Jokes at London's Soho Theatre for a week. It was a mix of comedy songs and stand-up. The show was a huge success and led to Clark taking the show on the road for a mini-tour of eight dates across England and Wales.

Clark's
In 2006, Clark set up a monthly comedy night called Clark's. He was the host and curated every show. It became a firm favourite among audiences and comics alike. A place where comedians would try out new ideas, it would often play host to some huge TV names, wanting to experiment. Its original home, between 2006–2009, was at the Lowdown at The Albany, a fringe venue below The Albany pub on Great Portland Street. In 2009, it moved to London's famous 100 Club on Oxford Street. It was revived for three nights in July 2013 at London's Soho Theatre. Among the many names that played there were Eddie Izzard, Noel Fielding, Jack Whitehall, Stephen Merchant, Cardinal Burns, Tim Key, Rich Fulcher, Oram & Meeten, Alice Lowe, Sarah Pascoe, Paul Foot, Tony Law, Arnab Chanda, and Sarah Kendall. Time Out said of the show, "One of the coolest nights in London is Clark's. Hosted by the utterly charming Dan Clark and is home to a lot of the new wave of young, offbeat, erudite comedians."

Dan Clark & The Difficult Three
In 2012, Clark recorded his debut comedy rock album. The band is made up of professional musicians Ben Parker, Johnny de'Ath, and Jimmy Sims. The album, simply titled Dan Clark & The Difficult Three was released on 1 July 2013 via Absolute Records after a three-month crowdfunding campaign.

Filmography

Film

Television
As actor

As himself

Writing credits

References

External links

Dan Clark on Myspace
BBC Interview
The Times Interview with Caitlin Moran and Dan Clark
Time Out Interview
Scotsman Q&A

1976 births
Living people
English stand-up comedians
English male television actors
English television directors
English television writers
Male actors from London
People from Bromley
20th-century English male actors
21st-century English male actors
British male television writers